Polezhayevo is a rural locality (a village) in Krasnopolyanskoye Rural Settlement, Nikolsky District, Vologda Oblast, Russia. The population was 136 as of 2002.

Geography 
Polezhayevo is located 36 km west of Nikolsk (the district's administrative centre) by road. Polovinka is the nearest rural locality.

References 

Rural localities in Nikolsky District, Vologda Oblast